Stoopid is a common misspelling or ironic spelling of stupid. It may also refer to:

 "Stoopid!", a 2011 song by CeCe Peniston
 "Stoopid" (6ix9ine song), a 2018 song by 6ix9ine
 Stoopid Records, a record label by American band Slightly Stoopid
 Stoopid Buddy Stoodios, a production company who produced Robot Chicken

See also
 Stupid (disambiguation)